J. P. E. Harper-Scott (born 3 December 1977) is a British musicologist and formerly Professor of Music History and Theory at Royal Holloway, University of London. He is a General Editor of the Cambridge University Press series 'Music in Context'.

Education and employment 

John Paul Edward Harper-Scott was born in Easington, County Durham. He was educated at Shotton Hall Comprehensive School, and received an undergraduate degree at Durham University. He subsequently received a D.Phil at the University of Oxford in 2004, for a thesis "Elgar's musical language : analysis, hermeneutics, humanity". He worked at the University of Nottingham and the University of Liverpool before moving to Royal Holloway, University of London. In September 2021, Harper-Scott announced his resignation from Royal Holloway over dissatisfaction with the increasing politicisation of music in academia and attempts to 'decolonise' the curriculum.

Scholarship 

Known for his work on musical modernism, he has argued that Edward Elgar should be considered 'a subtle and important harbinger of twentieth-century modernism'. He has also established a link between techniques of music analysis and the theories of Jacques Lacan. According to Lawrence Kramer, Harper-Scott's The Quilting Points of Musical Modernism poses a challenge to musicology: he writes that 'the book is a sweeping indictment of musicology and a manifesto for its transformation. Its core thesis is that musicology today is mired in a neoliberal late-Capitalist swamp from which it blindly ignores "our most pressing present concern – to escape the horrors of the present by imagining the transformations of a coming society".' One result of his work is that ideology critique, traditionally associated in musicology with the philosopher Adorno (1903–69), 'has a significant role to play in the future of the discipline'.

Bibliography

As author
Edward Elgar, Modernist (Cambridge and New York: Cambridge University Press, 2006).
Elgar: an Extraordinary Life (London: Associated Board of the Royal Schools of Music, 2007).
The Quilting Points of Musical Modernism: Revolution, Reaction, and William Walton (Cambridge and New York: Cambridge University Press, 2012).
Ideology in Britten's Operas (Cambridge and New York: Cambridge University Press, 2018).

As editor
Elgar Studies, edited with Julian Rushton (Cambridge and New York: Cambridge University Press, 2007).
An Introduction to Music Studies, edited with Jim Samson (Cambridge and New York: Cambridge University Press, 2009).

References

Secondary sources
 Beard, David, and Gloag, Kenneth, eds, Musicology: The Key Concepts, 2nd edn. (London and New York: Routledge, 2016).
 Begbie, Jeremy, 'Confidence and Anxiety in Elgar's "Dream of Gerontius"', in Music and Theology in Nineteenth-Century Britain, edited by Martin Clarke (Farnham: Ashgate, 2012), pp. 197–214.
 Hicks, Jonathan, 'Musicology for Art Historians', in The Routledge Companion to Music and Visual Culture, edited by Tim Sheppard and Anne Leonard (New York and London: Routledge, 2014), pp. 35–42.
 Kramer, Lawrence, The Thought of Music (Oakland: University of California Press, 2016).

External links 

1977 births
People from Easington, County Durham
Living people
Alumni of the University of Oxford
Academics of Royal Holloway, University of London
British musicologists
Fellows of St Hugh's College, Oxford
Alumni of St Chad's College, Durham